was the lead ship in the two-vessel  of heavy cruisers in the Imperial Japanese Navy. The ship was named after the Tone River, in the Kantō region of Japan and was completed on 20 November 1938 at Mitsubishi's Nagasaki shipyards. Tone was designed for long-range scouting missions and had a large seaplane capacity. She was extensively employed during World War II usually providing scouting services to their aircraft carrier task forces.  She almost always operated in this capacity in conjunction with her sister ship .

World War II

Early Pacific War
At the end of 1941, Tone was assigned to CruDiv 8 with her sister ship, Chikuma, and was thus present during the attack on Pearl Harbor. That day, 7 December 1941, Tone and Chikuma each launched one Aichi E13A1 "Jake" floatplane for a final weather reconnaissance over Oahu. At 0630, Tone and Chikuma each launched short-range Nakajima E4N2 Type 90-2 Reconnaissance Seaplane to act as pickets and patrol south of the Striking Force. Tones floatplane flew to Lahaina, but found no American fleet units present.

On 16 December, CruDiv 8 was ordered to assist in the second attempted invasion of Wake Island. Tone launched two Nakajima E8N "Daves" for anti-submarine patrols. After the fall of Wake Island, CruDiv 8 returned to Kure, Hiroshima. By 14 January 1942, CruDiv 8 was based out of Truk in the Caroline Islands, and covered the landings of Japanese troops at Rabaul, New Britain as well as attacks on Lae and Salamaua, New Guinea. On 24 January, Tones floatplanes attacked the Admiralty Islands. After 1 February air raid on Kwajalein by Vice Admiral William Halsey, Jr aboard the aircraft carrier , Tone departed Truk with the Carrier Striking Force in an unsuccessful pursuit. Chikuma and Tone later participated in the Raid on Port Darwin, Australia on 19 February, which destroyed 15 aircraft and sinking 11 ships. Tone launched a floatplane to report in weather conditions prior to the attack, but the plane’s radio failed and it returned without reporting. Later, another floatplane had greater success, and shot down a PBY Catalina of the RAAF.

Battle of the Java Sea
On 1 March 1942, Tone spotted the old American destroyer ,  SSE of Christmas Island. Four days later, floatplanes from Tone and Chikuma took part on the strike against Tjilatjap. On 6 March, Tone rescued a British seaman who had been adrift since his ship had been sunk off Java on 27 February.

Indian Ocean Raids
On 5 April 1942, Tone was part of a major task force which launched 315 aircraft against British-held Colombo, Ceylon. Tone and the rest of the task force returned to Japan in mid-April 1942, when it was almost immediately assigned to the unsuccessful pursuit of Admiral Halsey's Task Force 16.2 with the aircraft carrier  after the Doolittle Raid.

Battle of Midway
At the crucial Battle of Midway, Tone and CruDiv 8 was part of Vice Admiral Chūichi Nagumo's Carrier Striking Force. On 4 June, Tone and Chikuma each launched two "Jakes" to search out  for American carriers. Tones floatplane discovered American ships, but owing to internal bureaucracy in their command structure its report was not immediately delivered to Admiral Nagumo. As a result, he had already ordered his aircraft to prepare for another attack on Midway before he received the report. Tone was attacked by enemy carrier aircraft during the battle, but sustained no damage, except the loss of a "Dave" with its crew. Chikuma and Tone were then detached to support Vice Admiral Boshiro Hosogaya's Aleutian invasion force. However, the anticipated American counter-attack failed to materialize. CruDiv 8 cruised northern waters uneventfully.

Rear Admiral Chuichi Hara assumed command of CruDiv 8 from 14 July 1942.

Battle of the Eastern Solomons
On 24 August 1942, CruDiv 7's  and  arrived to join the reinforcement fleet for Guadalcanal. The following morning, a Consolidated PBY Catalina spotted Ryūjō, which Douglas SBD Dauntlesses and Grumman TBF Avengers from Enterprise unsuccessfully attacked. Seven floatplanes from Tone and Chikuma were launched to locate the American fleet. One of Chikumas planes spotted the Americans, but was shot down before its report could be relayed. However, a second floatplane was more successful, and the Japanese launched an attack against Enterprise, hitting it with three bombs which set her wooden deck on fire. However, in the meantime, the Americans located the Japanese fleet, and Ryūjō was sunk by planes from the carrier . Tone was attacked unsuccessfully by two Avengers whose Mark 13 torpedoes missed, returning to Truk safely.

Battle of Santa Cruz
Through October, Chikuma and Tone patrolled north of the Solomon Islands, awaiting word of recapture of Henderson Field by the Japanese. On 19 October, Tone (with the destroyer ) was detached on an independent mission to scout for American ships. Both ships operated off the Santa Cruz Islands until a Kawanishi H6K "Emily" from Jaluit Atoll sighted a carrier off the New Hebrides. They located the American fleet, and Abe followed with an attack by carrier planes which sank the carrier  and damaged the battleship  and cruiser . However, two of the four aircraft launched by Tone during the attack were shot down.

Tone supported Japanese reinforcement efforts at Guadalcanal through mid-November 1942, and was then assigned to patrols from its base in Truk through mid-February 1943. After returning to Maizuru for refit on 21 February, two additional twin-mount Type 96 25-mm AA guns were installed along with a Type 21 air-search radar. On 15 March 1943 Rear Admiral Kishi Fukuji assumed command of CruDiv 8, and Tone was ordered back to Truk. However, on 17 May, Chikuma and Tone were tasked to accompany battleship  back to Tokyo for the state funeral of Admiral Isoroku Yamamoto. Tone was back in Truk by 15 July, having avoided numerous submarine attacks along the route. From July to November, Tone was engaged in making troop transport runs to Rabaul, and to patrols of the Marshall Islands in unsuccessful pursuit of the American fleet. While back at Kure on 6 November, Tone gained additional 25-mm AA guns, bringing its total to 20. CruDiv 8 was disbanded on 1 January 1944, and both Tone and Chikuma were reassigned to CruDiv 7 (with Suzuya and Kumano) under Rear Admiral Shoji Nishimura. Tone returned to Truk on 2 January. In February, Tone assisted with the evacuation of Japanese forces from Truk to Palau.

From 1 March 1944, Tone was assigned to commerce raiding in the Indian Ocean. On 9 March, Tone sank the British freighter , taking aboard 108 survivors against orders. Of the survivors, 32 were disembarked as prisoners of war at Batavia. Admiral Naomasa Sakonju aboard the cruiser , ordered that the remaining prisoners be "disposed of", and they were taken out to sea and beheaded. (Following the war, Sakonju was executed for war crimes, including the murder of these prisoners, while the former commander of Tone, Captain Haruo Mayazumi, was sentenced to seven years imprisonment.) On 20 March 1944, Rear Admiral Kazutaka Shiraishi assumed command of CruDiv 7.

Battle of the Philippine Sea
On 13 June 1944, Admiral Soemu Toyoda activated "Operation A-GO" for the defense of the Mariana Islands. Tone was assigned to Force "C" of Vice Admiral Jisaburo Ozawa's Mobile Fleet, which proceeded through the Visayan Sea to the Philippine Sea headed towards Saipan. While at Kure from 26 June to 8 July 1944, Tone gained additional Type 96 25-mm AA, bringing its total to 57. Two new Type 22 surface-search radars and a Type 13 air-search radar were also fitted. After ferrying army troops to Okinawa, Tone was reassigned back to Singapore in July.

Battle of Leyte Gulf
On 23 October 1944, Tone along with the cruisers Kumano, Suzuya and Chikuma, sortied from Brunei towards the Philippines with Admiral Takeo Kurita's First Mobile Striking Force. The battle group was attacked by submarines while steaming through the Palawan Passage. The cruisers Atago and Maya were sunk, and Takao was damaged. As the force entered the Sibuyan Sea on 24 October, the Center Force suffered eleven raids by aircraft from the carriers of  Task Group 38.2. Musashi was sunk and Tone was hit by bombs. Tone engaged the American destroyer  but was driven away by air attack. She escaped back through the San Bernardino Strait without further damage, but Tones sister ship Chikuma was lost, along with the cruisers  and Suzuya.

Drydock and use as a training ship

On 6 November, Tone departed Brunei towards Manila, and onward to Mako in the Pescadores and Kure. Back in dry dock in Maizuru, Tone gained four additional triple-mount 25-mm AA guns aft, bringing its total to 62. The Type 21 radar was replaced with a Type 22. CruDiv 7 was disbanded 21 November and Tone reassigned to CruDiv 5 with Kumano. Once repairs were completed on 18 February 1945, Tone relocated to Etajima, where it was moored for use as a training ship. It was slightly damaged in an air raid on 19 March.

Sinking during the bombing of Kure
On 24 July 1945, Task Force 38 launched a large air raid against Kure aimed at the final destruction of the Imperial Japanese Navy. Nine aircraft from the light carrier Monterey hit Tone with three bombs, causing her to settle to the bottom of the bay. Tone was removed from the Navy List on 20 November 1945 and scrapped after the war from 1947–1948.

References

Notes

Books

External links 

 
 Tabular record:   CombinedFleet.com: Tone history (Retrieved 26 January 2007.)
 Interview with Paul Brehm of Ticonderoga describing the attack on Tone on 28 July 1945
Two photos of Tone, but you must type Tone in the pic search window, 
 World War II Cruisers
 Military Times

Tone-class cruisers
Ships built by Mitsubishi Heavy Industries
1937 ships
World War II cruisers of Japan
Shipwrecks in the Inland Sea
Cruisers sunk by aircraft
Maritime incidents in July 1945
Ships sunk by US aircraft
Japanese war crimes